Norton-Villiers was a British motorcycle manufacturer formed in the 1960s following the collapse of AMC. With the general decline of the British motorcycle industry, under a British Government initiative it was later combined with the remnants of BSA Triumph to form Norton-Villiers-Triumph.

Norton Villiers (1966–1973)
In 1966 AMC went bankrupt and were taken over by Manganese Bronze Holdings which formed Norton-Villiers to oversee operations. At the time Norton was the only motorcycle marque in the company that was making money. The AJS and Matchless traditional single cylinder four-stroke models were finished. Matchless and AJS badged models, with Norton motors, were assembled till 1969. In 1968 all models had new carburettors, ignition systems and an ignition lock. The G15CS, N15CS and M33CS had improved cycle parts for 1968–69.

The P11 series was a completely new development for 1967 and was further developed for 1968–69. The P11 was available either as Norton or Matchless.

Norton Commando

For Norton-Villiers the development of a new engine to market was cost-prohibitive, but the vibration of the 750 cc vertical twin was so well transmitted to the rider through the Featherbed frame of the Norton Atlas, that it was dropped in favour of an earlier experimental frame (based on a concept bike designated P10, and later Z26 as an improvement) that would separate the engine from the frame with rubber bushes, creating a more rider-friendly experience.

The Norton Isolastic frame was developed in time for the 1967 Earls CourtShow. Production began in April 1968, but bending problems with the frame resulted in a more-developed frame being introduced in January 1969.

The Norton Commando promptly turned up in racing events, amongst the first being London dealer Vincent Davey running a team under the Gus Kuhn name with riders Dave Croxford and Mick Andrew.

The 1969 Commando S was introduced fitted with a high-level left-side exhaust and a  petrol tank, primarily aimed at the export (US) market. The original model was thereafter referred to as the Commando Fastback.

Manufacture

In late 1968 the Plumstead works at Burrage Grove, where engines from the Wolverhampton plant and frames from the Manchester plant were assembled into complete machines, were presented with a Greater London Council compulsory purchase order. The Plumstead works closed in July 1969.

A Government subsidy allowed assembly to move to a factory at North Way, Andover, with an aircraft hangar on nearby Thruxton Airfield housing the Test Department. Manufacturing was concentrated at Wolverhampton, in the former Villiers factory, with 80 complete machines produced there each week. Wolverhampton also shipped components, assembled engines, and gearboxes to the Andover assembly line.

NV Motorcycle models

Neale Shilton designed a Commando to police specifications, the Norton Interpol. It had panniers, top box, fairing, and fittings for auxiliary electrical equipment
March 1970, Roadster
June 1970, Commando S  discontinued
September 1970, Fastback MK. 2, soon replaced by the Fastback Mk.3
May 1971, Street Scrambler and the Hi Rider
July 1971 Fastback Long Range
January 1972  Mk.4 Fastback, an updated Roadster, and the 750 Interstate, with Combat engines.

Combat engine

The high performance Combat engine gave  at 6,500 rpm using 10 :1 compression ratio. It was too much for the stretched old 1948 Model 7 497 cc-based design, with main bearing failures and broken pistons being reported in the press, along with quality control issues.
The solution to the main bearing problems was the much-fabled bearings designated "Superblend" by Norton in a 1972 Service Release. These bearings were a 'special' with additional crowning, marked 6/MRJA30 and made by R&M (later RHP).  Early in 1973 a superseding service release referred to Extra High Capacity Main Bearings.  These were in reality just a higher load capacity roller bearing NJ306E made by FAG. The piston issues were resolved by removing the slot for oil drainage behind the oil ring, and drilling a series of holes instead, so that the piston crown didn't separate from the piston at higher RPMs.

Forced merger

This brought a deterioration in finances. By the middle of 1972 the BSA group was in serious financial trouble as a result of its BSA and Triumph motorcycle activities. The government offered a financial rescue package contingent on a merger of the two groups and Norton-Villiers-Triumph was born.

Sources
Motorcycle History (retrieved 21 October 2006)

References

Royal Enfield Motors
Defunct motorcycle manufacturers of the United Kingdom
Defunct companies based in the West Midlands (county)
Companies based in Wolverhampton
British companies established in 1966
Vehicle manufacturing companies established in 1966
Manufacturing companies disestablished in 1972
1966 establishments in England
1972 disestablishments in England